Jake Lynch (born 1965) is a journalist, academic and writer, and a scholarly authority within the fields of peace journalism and peace research. He is an academic with the University of Sydney, although for 2020 he is on secondment as a Leverhulme Visiting Professor at the Centre for Trust, Peace and Social Relations at Coventry University, UK.

Education
Lynch attended Cardiff University, where he completed a BA degree in English (First Class Honours) in 1988 and a Postgraduate Diploma in Journalism Studies (Distinction) with Cardiff University in 1989. He subsequently attended City University, London, where he completed a PhD degree in 2008.

Professional career

Lynch worked as a journalist for two decades,  including work with The Independent, the Sky News and with BBC News. Latterly, he has worked in academia, and currently holds the position of Associate Professor within the Faculty of Arts and Social Sciences at Sydney University. He was formerly Director of the Center for Peace and Conflict Studies at Sydney University, and later Chair of the Department of Peace and Conflict Studies at the university. Lynch has also previously served as Secretary-General of the International Peace Research Association, and has held visiting fellowships with the universities of Cardiff, Bristol and Johannesburg.

Honours and awards
Lynch has received numerous awards, most recently the Luxembourg Peace Prize for his work in peace journalism.

Activism
Lynch has been active in human rights campaigns, in the Boycott, Divestment and Sanctions (BDS) campaign, and in campaigns for Palestinian rights. In 2013, Shurat HaDin, an Israeli NGO, commenced legal action in the Federal Court of Australia against Lynch, alleging a breach of Australia's anti-racism laws over Lynch's active support for the BDS campaign. The case, however, was subsequently dismissed by His Honour Justice Alan Robertson, with costs in favour of Lynch.

In March 2015, Lynch was investigated by the University of Sydney after confronting attendees at a pro-Israel talk at the university featuring retired British Colonel and pro-Israel advocate Richard Kemp. Lynch was criticised for thrusting money in the face of at least one Jew. In late April 2015, Lynch was cleared of allegations of anti-Semitism by the University of Sydney, a decision by welcomed by Palestinian advocates but criticised by Jewish groups.

See also
 List of peace activists

Bibliography
 Lynch, J. (2017). Terrorism, the "Blowback" thesis and the UK media. Peace Review, 29(4), pp. 443–449.
 Lynch, J. (2017). News coverage, peacemaking and peacebuilding. In Robinson, Piers; Seib, Philip; Frohlich, Romy (eds.), Routledge Handbook of Media, Conflict and Security, (pp. 197–209). Abingdon: Routledge.
 Lynch, J. (2018) Foreword. Peace Journalism Principles and Practices, (pp. xv-xvii). New York: Routledge.
 Lynch, J. (2018). Where I stand on peace journalism and the academic boycott of Israel. Conflict and Communication, 17(1), pp. 1–4.
 Lynch, J. (2018). Peace Journalism. Oxford Research Encyclopedia of Communication: Journalism Studies. New York: Oxford University Press.
 Lynch, J. (2019). Public Service Broadcasting and Security Issues: The Case of 'Blowback'. In Shaw, Ibrahim Seaga; Selvarajah, Senthan (eds.), Reporting Human Rights, Conflicts, and Peacebuilding: Critical and Global Perspectives, (pp. 85–101). Cham: Palgrave Macmillan.
 Hussain, S., Lynch, J. (2019). Identifying peace-oriented media strategies for deadly conflicts in Pakistan. Information Development, 35(5), pp. 703–713.
 Lynch, J. (2019). Blood on the Stone. London, United Kingdom: Unbound. (Historical Novel).

References

1965 births
Living people
Academic staff of the University of Sydney
Australian journalists